Anton de Kom University is the only university in Suriname. It is located in the capital, Paramaribo, and named for Anton de Kom, an anti-colonialist activist who was killed by the Nazis while in exile in the Netherlands.

History

Founding
Tertiary education in Suriname dates back to the 19th century. In 1882 there was already tertiary education provided at the Geneeskundige School and there also existed an organized juridical education (The Law-school), which was founded in the late forties. Furthermore, there were other para-university courses, namely the discipline to become a surveyor, dentist and pharmacist.

At the centenary of the Estates of Suriname in 1966, this organization took the important decision to cooperate with the government of Suriname to found a university.  The proclamation was made on 1 November 1968, in the then still existing Theatre Star. Since then, the first of November is celebrated as Founders' Day.

Linguist Hein Eersel was appointed as the first chancellor of the University of Suriname.  The Faculty of Law opened first, and other faculties followed:
 The Faculty der Medische Wetenschappen on 26 September 1969
 The Faculty der Sociaal – Economische Wetenschappen on 1 November 1975
 The Faculty der Natuurtechnische Wetenschappen on 1 December 1976
 The Faculty der Technische Wetenschappen on 1 December 1977

Renaming 
The university was closed from December 1982 until 17 October 1983, when it was renamed after Anton de Kom.

Faculties
The Anton de Kom University of Suriname has the following faculties:

 The Faculty of Medical Sciences
Medicine and Physiotherapy
 The Faculty of Social Sciences
Law
Economics, main subjects General Economics and Business Economics
Management of Education and the Study of Social Changes within Society
Public Administration
Sociology
Business Management
Psychology
 The Faculty of Technological Sciences
Agricultural Production, main subjects Soil Sciences, Forestry, Agriculture, Animal Husbandry
Mineral Production, main subjects Geology, Mining
Electrical Engineering, main subjects Energy Technique, Information Technology
Infrastructure, main subjects Building and Construction, Civil Engineering, Geoinformatics, Land and Water Management
Environmental Sciences, main subjects Management of Aquatic Resources, Management of Environmental and Natural Resources
Mechanical Engineering, main subjects Production Technology, Engineering Mechanics and Materials, Process and Energy
The Faculty of Humanities
Dutch
History
The Faculty of Mathematical and Physical Sciences
Chemistry
Mathematics
Biology
Physics

Board
The University Board is the highest governing body of the University and has the entire responsibility of the organization. Prof. Dr. Jack Menke is the current president.

Research institutes
There are five research centers doing research within their specific fields, and also rendering services to the community. The following are research centers: 
  Centre for Agricultural Research in Suriname (CELOS)
Objective: promoting agricultural scientific education and research at the Faculty of Technological Sciences
 Institute for Applied Technology (INTEC)
Objective: executing research projects in the field of technology  
 Bio-Medical Research Institute Prof. dr. Paul Flu (MWI)
Objective: promoting scientific education and research at the Faculty of Medical Sciences
  Institute for Development Planning and Management (IDPM)
Objective: supporting the development policy of the Surinamese government
  Institute for Social Science Research (IMWO)
Objective: executing social scientific research and rendering service

Other institutes
 Institute of International Relations (IIR/Adekus)
 Library Anton de Kom, University of Suriname

Regulations for registration
Foreign students who meet the relevant minimum requirements must master the Dutch language to be able to follow the classes. They may submit a petition to the Ministry of Education via the University Board.

Notable alumni
 Alice Amafo Surinamese Minister of Agriculture and Housing
 Niermala Badrising  Surinamese ambassador to the United States
 Marinus Bee Chairman of the National Assembly of Suriname
 Marthelise Eersel Surinamese physician and former Director of the Ministry of Health
 Winston Lackin former Surinamese Minister of Foreign Affairs
 Irene Lalji former Surinamese lawyer and television presenter
 Yldiz Pollack-Beighle former Surinamese Minister of Foreign Affairs
 Gregory Rusland Leader of the National Party of Suriname
 Dew Sharman Vice Chairperson of the National Assembly of Suriname
 Jennifer Simons former Chairperson of the National Assembly of Suriname

See also
Communications in Suriname

References

External links

 
Universities in Suriname
Educational institutions established in 1983
1983 establishments in Suriname
Buildings and structures in Paramaribo